Hoyles is a surname. Notable people with the surname include:

Celia Hoyles (born 1946), British mathematician
Hugh Hoyles (1814–1888), Canadian politician
Newman Wright Hoyles (1777–1840), English businessman

Fictional
Jayden Hoyles, from Daybreak (2019 TV series)

See also
Hoyle